Multi-antimicrobial extrusion protein (MATE) also known as multidrug and toxin extrusion or multidrug and toxic compound extrusion  is a family of proteins which function as drug/sodium or proton antiporters.

Function 

The MATE proteins in bacteria, archaea and eukaryotes function as fundamental transporters of metabolic and xenobiotic organic cations.

Structure 

These proteins are predicted to have 12 alpha-helical transmembrane regions, some of the animal proteins may have an additional C-terminal helix. The X-ray structure of the NorM was determined to 3.65 Å, revealing an outward-facing conformation with two portals open to the outer leaflet of the membrane and a unique topology of the predicted 12 transmembrane helices distinct from any other known multidrug resistance transporter.

Discovery 

The multidrug efflux transporter NorM from V. parahaemolyticus which mediates resistance to multiple antimicrobial agents (norfloxacin, kanamycin, ethidium bromide etc.) and its homologue from E. coli were identified in 1998. NorM seems to function as drug/sodium antiporter which is the first example of Na+-coupled multidrug efflux transporter discovered. NorM is a prototype of a new transporter family and Brown et al. named it the multidrug and toxic compound extrusion family. NorM is nicknamed "Last of the multidrug transporters" because it is the last multidrug transporter discovered functionally as well as structurally.

Genes 

The following human genes encode MATE proteins:
 SLC47A1
 SLC47A2

See also 
 Solute carrier family
 Resistance-Nodulation-Cell Division Superfamily (RND)

References 

Protein families
Solute carrier family